Charles Herbert "Bert" Locke OBE (21 September 1910 – 15 May 1977) was an Australian company director, who served as chairman of Tooheys and Lend Lease Corporation, and a charity fundraiser. During World War II he was in command of Z Special Unit and rose to the rank of lieutenant colonel.

Early life
Locke was born in Turramurra, New South Wales, the fifth of seven children, and was educated at Newington College (1920–1925) and at Wrekin College in Shropshire, England. He worked in insurance before a brief stint as a jackaroo and then with Prudential Assurance where he rose to be Sydney managing agent with power of attorney for the British Equitable Assurance.

Career

Army service
In 1938 Locke was commissioned in the Militia.  He was transferred to the Australian Imperial Force in 1940. He was promoted to captain and served with the 9th Division in the Middle East. He  was mentioned in dispatches after service in Tobruk and Libya. In 1945 he took command of Z Special Unit and became a lieutenant colonel.

Business career
Returning from the war, Locke again worked in the insurance business and was involved in several Australian companies. He served as chairman of Toohey's Ltd, Lend Lease Corporation Ltd, International Computers (Australia) Pty Ltd and Anthony Squires Pty Ltd. He was a board member of the Australia Hotel Co. Ltd, Peko-Wallsend, Commercial & General Acceptance Ltd, Australian Equity Corporation Ltd, Permanent Trustee Co of New South Wales Ltd and the local board of Colonial Mutual Life Assurance Society Ltd.

Personal
In 1936 Locke married Lesley Alison Vine, with whom he had four children (3 sons and 1 daughter).  Lesley died in 1972.  Locke married Mary Clare Luya Gregory in 1973.  He died in San Francisco, California in 1977, from a myocardial infarction.

Honours
Locke was made an Officer of the Order of the British Empire in 1968.

References

1910 births
1977 deaths
People educated at Newington College
People educated at Wrekin College
Officers of the Order of the British Empire
Australian colonels
Z Special Unit personnel
Military personnel from New South Wales